Bacinol may refer to:
 Bacinol, code name for secret Dutch penicillin research during WWII.  See DSM (company)#History 
 Bacinol, and Bacinol 2, names of buildings in Delft, The Netherlands.  See Delft#Culture